The gort cloud is "a vast, largely invisible and growing (environmentally-aware) 'community' that sieves, measures and exchanges information on environmental (green) products and services." "The community includes NGOs, government agencies, certifying groups, academics, eco-tech specialists, business alliances, green media including green business news, sustainable designers, foundations, other social networks, conferences, trade shows, events, competitions, green blogs, special interest groups, and trendspotters—to name just a few." The book, "The Gort Cloud", examines the marketing and brand-building experiences of sustainable businesses in America and discusses the gort cloud concept. It was critically reviewed by TreeHugger in December 2008.

The gort cloud is analogous to a social network: "A social network is a social structure made of nodes (which are generally individuals or organizations) that are tied by one or more specific types of interdependency, such as values, visions, ideas, financial exchange, friendship, kinship, dislike, conflict or trade." In this case, the shared values of the gort cloud are a concern for the environment and the desire for more sustainable products and services.

The gort cloud can thus be thought of as a particular type of social network with inherent social value. According to Robert Putnam, "social networks have value. Just as a screwdriver (physical capital) or a college education (human capital) can increase productivity (both individual and collective), so too social contacts affect the productivity of individuals and groups". In this case, the group goal is the increased production of sustainable and socially responsible goods and services, and the decreased use of unsustainable or socially irresponsible goods and services. The gort cloud is not limited to social networks; it contains green social networks.

Function
Unlike social network services like Facebook or MySpace that "focus on building online communities of people who share interests and activities, or who are interested in exploring the interests and activities of others", nobody created the gort cloud, and no person or organization controls it. "The gort cloud is simply an interconnected group of people with a common cause: the health and preservation of our planet. But unlike consciously created social networks, no one dreamed up the gort cloud or organized it for a specific purpose. In fact, it's not organized. It just exists as a fluid community."

An example of the use of the gort cloud can be seen in the marketing of the book The Green Collar Economy written by Van Jones. Jones used outreach to the green community (gort cloud) and to other special interest communities to push his book up and onto The New York Times Best Seller list. "Using a Web-based, viral marketing strategy, Jones and Green For All, an environmental organization he recently founded, worked to get the word out about his book far and wide. The result was a place—number 12 to be exact—on The New York Times Best Seller list in the book's first week."

How the gort cloud vets individual products and services

The gort cloud vets green products and services in a process similar to academic peer review. Once a new green product is introduced, the 'community' will analyze it and judge it. Both experts and non-experts may investigate claims and check facts. "All this is made possible, of course, by the Internet — although the gort cloud is not simply a collection of websites. It is not an aspect of the Internet at all. It uses email and the Internet as well as book publishers, magazines, radio, television, trade shows and green events to communicate. The gort cloud is ultimately people and their organizations."

Etymology

According to the book, "The Gort Cloud", the author created the name: 
The inspiration for that moniker lies in the Oort cloud, named after the astronomer Jan Hendrik Oort. The Oort cloud is a vast field of stellar debris that orbits the Solar System. We can only detect it electronically and view its effects, mostly in the form of the occasional comet it tosses back into our neighborhood. This seems to perfectly describe the gort cloud, a vast green network made up of untidy bits that is most easily detected through electronic means and that has a huge effect on the evolution of green business.

Images

References 

Environmental movements